The Breisgau is an area in southwest Germany between the Rhine River and the foothills of the Black Forest. Part of the state of Baden-Württemberg, it centers on the city of Freiburg im Breisgau. The district of Breisgau-Hochschwarzwald, which partly consists of the Breisgau, is named after the Black Forest area. Parts of the Breisgau are also situated in the political districts of Freiburg im Breisgau and Emmendingen.

History

In earlier times, the Breisgau was known as Breisachgau, meaning the county around the town of Breisach on the east bank of the Rhine.

The earliest historically attested inhabitants were Celts. It remained a part of Alemannia throughout the Early Middle Ages and was a buffer zone between the central Alemannic lands and Alsace, which was less strongly colonized by the Alemanni.

In the mid-9th century, it was a march-like county guarding the frontier with southern Lotharingia and Alsace. In 859, it was bestowed on Charles the Fat, the son of King Louis I, a sign of its importance. In the 10th century, the Breisgau was a county within the Duchy of Swabia, ruled by the Zähringen family. In the 12th century, they detached themselves from Swabia, establishing the Margraviate of Baden. In the Breisgau, the dukes of Zähringen founded Freiburg, which became their chief city.

In 1805, by the Treaty of Pressburg, the area was ceded to the Grand Duchy of Baden.

Borders and area 

The Breisgau includes the flat area around river Rhine, the foothills of the Black Forest and the western faces of the southern Black Forest mountains and the Kaiserstuhl hills.

In the south, the Breisgau borders onto the Markgräflerland, in the west onto the Sundgau (Alsace, France), in the east onto the Black Forest, and in the north onto the Ortenau area.

Climate 

The climate of the Breisgau is warm; in fact, it is the warmest region in Germany. The average annual temperature is 11 degrees Celsius (52 degrees Fahrenheit), the average rainfall is 900 mm (36").

Agriculture 

The Breisgau is known for its wine and used for fruit tree orchards and grain.

Places in the Breisgau 

The biggest city by far in the Breisgau region is Freiburg. Other notable cities and towns are Bad Krozingen, Breisach, Emmendingen, Endingen, Kenzingen, Neuenburg, Staufen and Waldkirch.

A prominent mountain is the Schauinsland (1,284 m).

External links

 Pictures of the Breisgau 
 

Regions of Baden-Württemberg
Austrian Circle
Carolingian counties
Former states and territories of Baden-Württemberg